Salt Fork is an unincorporated community in southeast Grant County, Oklahoma, United States. The community is on Oklahoma State Highway 74 approximately six miles south of  Lamont and one mile south of the Salt Fork Arkansas River.

The community was originally called Elmpark, but it was renamed after the nearby Salt Fork Arkansas River. 

The community's post office was officially established on July 12, 1895, and it operated until April 30, 1951.

References

Populated places in Grant County, Oklahoma
Unincorporated communities in Oklahoma